Louise Élisabeth de Bourbon (22 November 1693–27 May 1775) was a daughter of Louis III de Bourbon, Prince of Condé, and his wife, Louise Françoise de Bourbon, légitimée de France, a legitimised daughter of King Louis XIV of France and his famous mistress, Madame de Montespan.

She was the wife of Louis Armand II de Bourbon, Prince of Conti. It was Louise Élisabeth who presented Madame de Pompadour to the court of King Louis XV of France. Louise Élisabeth was the Duchess of Étampes in her own right, having succeeded to the title at the death of her aunt, Marie Anne de Bourbon, Dowager Duchess of Vendôme. The county of Sancerre, previously held by her brother Louis Henri I, Prince of Condé, also became her property in 1740 at his death.

Biography
Louise Élisabeth was born on 22 November 1693, at the Palace of Versailles. As a member of the House of Bourbon-Condé, she was a princesse du sang. In youth, she was known at court as Mademoiselle de Charolais, a style later borne by her younger sister. Her parents' second daughter, and third child, she was one of nine children. She was baptised in the chapel of Versailles on 24 November 1698 with her brother Louis Henri and her sister Louise Anne.

Marriage
At the age of seventeen, it was suggested by her ambitious mother that she marry one of the king's grandsons, the young Duke of Berry. The marriage, however, did not take place due to the machinations of Louise Élisabeth's aunt, the Duchess of Orléans, who wanted the Duke for her own daughter, Marie Louise Élisabeth d'Orléans.

On 9 July 1713, Louise Élisabeth married her first cousin Louis Armand de Bourbon, Prince of Conti, at Versailles. Her husband, who was three years younger than his bride, had become the Prince of Conti in 1709 upon the early death of his father François Louis, Prince of Conti. His mother was the pious Marie Thérèse de Bourbon, eldest granddaughter of Le Grand Condé.

Her marriage was part of a double wedding between the Condé and Conti branches of the House of Bourbon; Louise Élisabeth's older brother Louis Henri de Bourbon married Mademoiselle de Conti, Marie Anne de Bourbon-Conti. The ceremony took place in the newly built Royal Chapel of Versailles.

Present at the wedding were her mother, paternal grandmother the Princess Palatine Anne, Dowager Princess of Condé; Charles, Duke of Berry, and his wife Marie Louise Élisabeth d'Orléans, her uncles Louis-Auguste de Bourbon, duc du Maine, Louis-Alexandre de Bourbon, comte de Toulouse and Philippe II, Duke of Orléans, as well as her aunts Françoise-Marie de Bourbon, Duchess of Orléans, and the two widowed Princesses of Conti, Marie Anne de Bourbon and Marie Thérèse de Bourbon.

In August 1716, at the age of twenty-two, Louise Élisabeth contracted smallpox from her husband, whom she had been nursing through his illness. A year later she gave birth to her first child. She and her husband had five children.

The Princess Palatine Elizabeth Charlotte, Duchess of Orléans (Madame), sister in law of Louis XIV and famous memoir writer, wrote of Louise Élisabeth circa 1719:

Louise Élisabeth had several extramarital affairs, such as her liaison with the handsome Philippe Charles de La Fare. These infidelities incensed her husband, whose jealousy made him turn physically violent against his wife. He is reported to have hurt his wife to the point that she had to see a doctor on two separate occasions. After a particularly dramatic scene in the Conti household, the princess refused to live with her husband anymore and took refuge with her mother. Later she fled to a convent. According to Saint-Simon, she once said of her husband:

he could not make a prince du sang without her, while she could make one without him.

The first years of her marriage were full of court cases at the Parlement de Paris against her husband due to his violent temper and her desire to leave him. In 1725, she consented to return to the Prince of Conti, who had her confined to the Château de l'Isle-Adam. She was able later, however, to convince him to allow her to return to Paris in order to give birth to her daughter, Louise Henriette. Her husband died a year later.

Due to his open support of the Scottish economist John Law who had implemented the introduction of paper money to France during the Régence of the young King Louis XV of France, her husband had made a fortune.

Her husband died in 1727 at the Hôtel de Conti (quai Conti) in Paris due to a "chest swelling". Louise Élisabeth was known at court either as Madame la Princesse de Conti troisième or Madame la Princesse de Conti dernière douairière, in order to distinguish Louise Élisabeth from the other two widowed princesses of Conti still alive:
Marie Anne de Bourbon (1666–1739), the legitimised daughter of Louis XIV and Louise de La Vallière and wife of Louis Armand I de Bourbon, Prince of Conti. She was known as Madame la Princesse de Conti première douairière as she was the first to be widowed in 1685. Her husband's Conti title fell upon his younger brother, François de Bourbon, Prince of Conti.
Marie Thérèse de Bourbon (1666–1732), the wife of François Louis de Bourbon, Prince of Conti and Louise Élisabeth's mother-in-law. She was known as Madame la Princesse de Conti seconde douairière after losing her husband in 1709.

In 1733 Louise Élisabeth purchased a townhouse with an extensive garden on the rue Saint-Dominique in Paris from Françoise de Mailly (widow of Louis Phélypeaux, Marquis de La Vrillière), and hired the architect Nicolas Simonnet to redecorate the interiors. At that time it also became known as the Hôtel de Conti. It is shown on the 1739 Turgot map of Paris as "H. de Conty".

The Dowager Princess and her aunt the Dowager Duchess of Orléans joined forces in 1743 to arrange the marriage of her son to her first cousin, Louise Diane d'Orléans, and that of her daughter to Louise Diane's nephew, the heir to the House of Orléans. This helped to somewhat smooth over the century-long feud between the House of Condé and House of Orléans, a feud fueled by the animosity between Louise Élisabeth's mother and aunt, the Princess of Condé and the Duchess of Orléans, both legitimised daughters of Louis XIV and Madame de Montespan.

After the death of her mother in June 1743, she acquired the château de Louveciennes, which later reverted to the Crown. Louis XV in turn gave it to the successor of Madame de Pompadour, Madame du Barry. The Dowager Princess of Conti later also acquired the château de Voisins.

Later, in 1746, the Dowager Princess was asked by Louis XV to present his new mistress, the future Madame de Pompadour, at court. She attended the ball at Versailles in honour of the marriage of Infanta Maria Teresa Rafaela of Spain to Louis, Dauphin of France in 1745. According to Nancy Mitford's Madame de Pompadour book, the proud Dowager Princess was annoyed at no one recognising her. She obliged the king in the hope that he would help her escape her debts, a tactic which worked.

Just before her death, the princess gave her townhouse on the rue Saint-Dominique to her grandson, Louis François Joseph, Comte de La Marche, and she died there at the age of eighty-one, on 27 May 1775. She was buried at the Église Saint-Sulpice in Paris.

Issue

Ancestry

References

|-

1693 births
1775 deaths
People from Versailles
Louise-Elisabeth
Louise-Elisabeth
Dukes of Étampes
18th-century French women
17th-century French women
People of the Regency of Philippe d'Orléans
People of the Ancien Régime
Louise-Elisabeth
Etampes, Duchess of, Louise Elisabeth de Bourbon
Louise-Elisabeth
Burials at Saint-Sulpice, Paris